Kuwait competed at the 1992 Summer Paralympics in Barcelona, Spain. 24 competitors from Kuwait won 5 medals, 1 gold, 3 silver and 1 bronze and finished 36th in the medal table.

See also 
 Kuwait at the Paralympics
 Kuwait at the 1992 Summer Olympics

References 

Kuwait at the Paralympics
1992 in Kuwaiti sport
Nations at the 1992 Summer Paralympics